Asphondyliini is a tribe of gall midges in the family Cecidomyiidae. There are about six genera and at least 100 described species in Asphondyliini.

Genera
 Ampelomyia
 Asphondylia
 Bruggmannia
 Bruggmanniella
 Daphnephila Kieffer, 1905
 Polystepha Kieffer, 1897
 Schizomyia
 Stephomyia

References

Further reading

External links

 

Cecidomyiinae
Nematocera tribes